The 2000 Heineken Open Shanghai was a men's tennis tournament played on outdoor hard courts in Shanghai, China that was part of the International Series of the 2000 ATP Tour. It was the fifth edition of the tournament and ran from 16 October through 22 October 2000. First-seeded Magnus Norman won the singles title.

Finals

Singles

 Magnus Norman defeated  Sjeng Schalken 6–4, 4–6, 6–3
 It was Norman's 5th singles title of the year and the 12th and last of his career.

Doubles

 Paul Haarhuis /  Sjeng Schalken defeated  Petr Pála /  Pavel Vízner 6–2, 3–6, 6–4
 It was Haarhuis's 1st title for the year and the 49th of his career. It was Schalken's only title of the year and the 4th of his career.

References

External links
 ITF tournament edition details

Heineken Open Shanghai
Kingfisher Airlines Tennis Open